Broken Chains is a 1922 American silent melodrama film directed by Allen Holubar. Starring Colleen Moore, Malcolm McGregor, and Ernest Torrence, it was based on the winning story from a scenario contest held by the Goldwyn Pictures Corporation and the Chicago Daily News. A print of Broken Chains is preserved at the George Eastman House archive.

Plot

Wealthy Peter Wyndham is useless in attempting to prevent the theft of Hortense Allen's jewelry. A butler is killed during the robbery, and unable to face his cowardice, Peter heads west. He takes a job working for his father's lumber mill. Meanwhile, elsewhere Mercy Boone's newborn child has died. Boyan Boone, her husband is callous towards the loss. He is a thug, and ne'er-do-well with a band of thieves working with him. When Mercy attempts to escape she meets Peter before Boyan returns her to his cabin where he chains her. Peter finds her and they begin a romance under Boyan's nose. Boyan learns and beats up Peter, who summons the strength to fight him for the honor of Mercy.

Cast
 Malcolm McGregor as Peter Wyndham
 Colleen Moore as Mercy Boone
 Ernest Torrence as Boyan Boone
 Claire Windsor as Hortense Allen
 James Marcus as Pat Mulcahy
 Beryl Mercer as Mrs Mulcahy
 William Orlamond as Slog Sallee
 Gerald Pring as Butler
 Edward Peil Sr. as Burglar (credited as Edward Peil)
 Leo Willis as Gus

Production
The Chicago Daily News, together with The Goldwyn Company, held a national scenario writing contest in 1921; first prize was $10,000 and a Goldwyn production based on the story. Among 27,000 entries, Winifred Kimball's "Broken Chains" was selected. The story was then given to experienced scenarist Carey Wilson to make it ready for filming.

Allen Holubar was borrowed from Associated First National for the project. Colleen Moore was the first actor to be cast. Stories in the trade press suggested concerns as to whether she would be equal to the heavily dramatic role, but her prior work was not limited to comedy and she had not been typecast. The role was expected to be her big break but failed to establish her as a star.

Casting was complete by June and filming was started. Portions of the film were shot in Northern California, near Santa Cruz in an area known as Poverty Flats.  By August photography was completed.

Reception
Broken Chains premiered December 10, 1922, in New York and Los Angeles, and went into general release December 24.

The Variety reviewer devoted several paragraphs to criticizing the climactic fight scene, calling it "preposterous" and reporting that the audience made fun of it. The plot overall was called "conventional"; however, the cast was commended. The review in The Film Daily found the scenario disappointing and opined, "The theme suffers severely from extreme characterization in each of the principal people." The reviewer advised exhibitors that the film "will satisfy those who still like the old-fashioned type of meller" and called the posters good looking.

In contrast, a review in Photodramatist, a magazine aimed at writers, praised both the story and the production: "There is the consummate handling of a subtle and really difficult theme, the sure touch in characterizations which so easily could have slipped into burlesque and bathos, the rapid piling of suspense on peril until the cumulative effect is terrific." A critic for the Santa Cruz Evening News, locale of the exterior filming, singled out Moore for praise: "Colleen Moore ... attains new laurels as an emotional actress. Her work is thoroughly convincing during the difficult sequences ..."

References
Notes

Citations

External links

 
 

1922 films
1922 romantic drama films
American adventure drama films
American romantic drama films
American black-and-white films
Films based on short fiction
Films shot in California
Goldwyn Pictures films
Adultery in films
Melodrama films
Films directed by Allen Holubar
1920s American films
Silent romantic drama films